Always Have, Always Will may refer to:

"Always Have, Always Will" (Ace of Base song) 
"Always Have, Always Will" (Janie Fricke song)